Rugby (known as EA Sports Rugby, and as Rugby 2001 in the European PC version; often mislabeled as Rugby 2002) is the 2000 installment of Electronic Arts' Rugby video game series. The game was developed by Creative Assembly and published by EA Sports. The game is EA Sports' first rugby union game on Microsoft Windows and PlayStation 2, and is succeeded by Rugby 2004. Rugby features over 20 teams, over 500 players and over 20 stadiums. The game's commentators are Bill McLaren and former England International Jamie Salmon. The game's cover features English player Martin Johnson.

The game featured the national teams who took part in the 1999 Rugby World Cup.

Reception

The PS2 version received "average" reviews according to the review aggregation website Metacritic.

References

External links
 

2000 video games
EA Sports games
PlayStation 2 games
Rugby union video games
Windows games
Creative Assembly games
Video games set in Argentina
Video games set in Australia
Video games set in France
Video games set in Ireland
Video games set in New Zealand
Video games set in South Africa
Video games set in the United Kingdom
Video games developed in the United Kingdom
Video games scored by Jeff van Dyck
Video games scored by Saki Kaskas